William Henry Longworth (fourth ¼ 1884 – death unknown) was an English professional rugby league footballer who played in the 1900s and 1910s. He played at representative level for Great Britain, England and Lancashire, and at club level for Central Rangers ARLFC, Glodwick ARLFC (Juniors), Chadderton ARLFC (formerly Werneth ARLFC), Oldham (Heritage No. 103) and Halifax  (Heritage No. 227), as a forward (prior to the specialist positions of), during the era of contested scrums.

Background
Bill Longworth's birth was registered in Oldham, Lancashire, England.

Playing career

International honours
Bill Longworth won caps for England while at Oldham in 1908 against Wales, in 1909 against Australia (3 matches), and won caps for Great Britain while at Oldham in 1908-09 against Australia (3 matches).

Championship appearances
Bill Longworth played in Oldham's victory in the Championship during the 1904–05 season, making his début in April 1905.

County Cup Final appearances
Bill Longworth played as a forward, i.e. number 10, in Oldham's 9-10 defeat by Wigan in the 1908 Lancashire County Cup Final during the 1908–09 season at Wheater's Field, Broughton, Salford on Saturday 19 December 1908.

References

External links
(archived by web.archive.org) Statistics at orl-heritagetrust.org.uk

1884 births
England national rugby league team players
English rugby league players
Great Britain national rugby league team players
Halifax R.L.F.C. players
Lancashire rugby league team players
Oldham R.L.F.C. players
Place of death missing
Rugby league forwards
Rugby league players from Oldham
Year of death missing